Neville Borton may refer to:

 Neville Arthur Blachley Borton (1847–1928), Anglican clergyman
 Neville Travers Borton (1870–1938), British Army Officer and civil servant